The Libertarian Party of Mississippi is the Mississippi affiliate of the U.S. Libertarian Party. The Chair is Vicky Hanson, Laz Austin is Vice Chair, Zach Britt is Secretary, and the Treasurer is Brian Keller.

Platform 
The Libertarian Party of Mississippi holds the same platform as the U.S. Libertarian Party. Some of the key tenets are:
 Limited government
 Fiscal management
 Individual responsibility
 A world at peace
 Protection of civil liberties
 A Laissez-faire economic system
 A maximization of personal liberties
 An uninhibited right to bear arms
 A free market healthcare system
 A foreign policy of non-interventionism
 A system of domestic and foreign free trade

Electoral record
In 2017, Steve McCluskey was elected mayor of McLain, Mississippi, the state's first elected member of the Libertarian Party of Mississippi.

References

External links 
 Libertarian Party of Mississippi
 Home

Mississippi
Political parties in Mississippi
Political parties established in 1990